The Chase Lake Prairie Project is an effort to restore and protect the largest remaining region in the lower 48 states for waterfowl production. Located in U.S. state of North Dakota and consisting of  spread across 11 counties, this region is composed of thousands of lakes and ponds and grassland prairie. 97% of the land area is privately owned, with the U.S. Fish and Wildlife Service working with landowners to protect wetlands and associated prairie regions in a collaborative effort to ensure the region continues to provide habitat for the millions of birds and other wildlife that are dependent on the ecosystem.

Efforts to ensure future protection of the region include wise use policies whereby ranchers and farmers will utilize native grasses when planting, rotate cattle regularly to prevent overgrazing, restore wetland environments that have been drained and prevent over hunting and  predation from mammals such as the coyote and fox. During the 1980s, a series of droughts and deliberate draining of the wetlands in the region had greatly reduced the available wetland habitat, adversely impacting the populations of dozens of species of birds. The United States and Canada jointly signed the North American Waterfowl Management Plan in 1986, in an effort to collaboratively work to restore lost and damaged wetlands. The Prairie Pothole Joint Venture was commenced in 1987 to protect the Prairie Pothole Region in North Dakota, South Dakota, Montana, Minnesota and Iowa and the Chase Lake Prairie Project began in May, 1989. As of 2005, over 2,000 wetland basins had been set aside, restored, or easements were signed to ensure habitat protection in an ongoing effort to restore the region to as natural a state as possible, while ensuring farmers and ranchers productivity s minimally impacted.

References

External links
 

National Wildlife Refuges in North Dakota
Wetlands of North Dakota
Bodies of water of Stutsman County, North Dakota